Neutert is a German surname and may refer to:

 Eugen Neutert (1905–1943), German resistance fighter against National Socialism
 Günther Neutert (1914–2003), German novelist, advertising manager, and publisher
 Natias Neutert (born 1947), German poet, thinker, performing artist, translator, and editor